Eucalyptus orbifolia, commonly known as round-leaved mallee,  is a tree which occurs in inland areas Australia.<ref>{{cite book|author1=Holliday, I|author2=Watton, G|year=1980|title=A Gardener's Guide to Eucalypts|publisher=Rigby}}</ref>

Description
The tree produces showy cream-yellow flowers predominantly between mid-winter and late spring from July to November. It has rough minni ritchi bark on the trunk. Like most mallees it has multiple stems. The bark is reddish brown in colour and which peels and curls outwards, exposing paler white-grey bark below.

Taxonomy
The species was first formally described by the botanist Ferdinand von Mueller in 1859 as part of the work Fragmenta Phytographiae Australiae. Known synonyms include Eucalyptus lata described by L.A.S.Johnson and K.D.Hill in 1992 in Systematic studies in the eucalypts - 5. New taxa and combinations in Eucalyptus (Myrtaceae) in Western Australia published in the journal Telopea. The name is also often misapplied to Eucalyptus websteriana described by Joseph Maiden in 1916 in the work Notes on Eucalyptus, (with descriptions of new species) published in Journal and Proceedings of the Royal Society of New South Wales.
The name specific epithet (orbifolia'') is from Latin meaning "round" and "-leaved".

Distribution
It is found amongst granite outcrops and on slopes and ridges in the Mid West, Wheatbelt and Goldfields regions of Western Australia between Mount Magnet, Mukinbudin and Kalgoorlie where it grows in shallow gravelly red sandy or sandy-clay soils. The range extends into central Australia west of Alice Springs in the Northern Territory and northern South Australia.

Use in horticulture
The mallee is sold as seed or as seedlings. It will grow well in a full sun position and is drought and frost tolerant when established. Suitable as an ornamental or as a light screen, it also attracts native birds. The seeds propagate easily and it can be grown in a large container.

See also
List of Eucalyptus species

References

orbifolia
Eucalypts of Western Australia
Trees of Australia
Myrtales of Australia
Plants described in 1859
Taxa named by Ferdinand von Mueller